Buckie railway station was a railway station in Buckie, in current day Moray. The station was opened by the Great North of Scotland Railway (GNoSR) on its Moray Firth coast line in 1886, served by Aberdeen to Elgin trains.

The GNoSR was absorbed by the London and North Eastern Railway in 1923 and became part of British Railways when the railways were nationalised in 1948. The station and line was recommended for closure by Dr Beeching's report "The Reshaping of British Railways" and closed on 6 May 1968.

History

Background
The Great North of Scotland Railway introduced a bill to parliament in 1881 to extend its line from Portsoy along the Moray Firth to Buckie, and this was opposed by the Highland Railway and rejected. The following year both the Great North and Highland railways applied to parliament for permission, the Great North for a  line from Portsoy along the coast through Buckie to Elgin, and the Highland for a branch from Keith to Buckie and Cullen. Authority was granted, but in the case of the Highland Railway only for a line as far as Portessie.

Great North of Scotland Railway
The GNoSR station opened on 1 May 1886 with the central section of the coast line, served by through Aberdeen to Elgin trains. In 1923 the Great North of Scotland Railway was absorbed by the  London and North Eastern Railway. This was nationalised in 1948, and services provided by British Railways. The station and line was recommended for closure by Dr Beeching's in his report "The Reshaping of British Railways" and closed on 6 May 1968.

Services
The GNoSR station was served by four through trains a day between Aberdeen to Elgin.

In summer 1948, Buckie was served by four Aberdeen to Inverness trains, with Buckie about  hours from Aberdeen. There was also a mid-day Keith Town to Inverness service and an evening service from Aberdeen that terminated at Elgin. There were three services from Inverness to Aberdeen,  a service from Lossiemouth and Elgin to Aberdeen and a Saturday service from Inverness to Keith that after 19 June was accelerated and extended to Aberdeen. There were no Sunday services.

References

Footnotes

Sources

External links
RAILSCOT on Buckie and Portessie Branch
RAILSCOT on Moray Coast Railway

Former Great North of Scotland Railway stations
Disused railway stations in Moray
Railway stations in Great Britain opened in 1886
Railway stations in Great Britain closed in 1968
Beeching closures in Scotland
Buckie